"Lying from You" is a song by American rock band Linkin Park, released on March 16, 2004. It was released as an airplay-only single from their second album, Meteora, which was released on March 25, 2003.

Song information
The song opens up with a viola-influenced keyboard sample that leads into it being looped throughout the verses. It also contains a sample of a car burning out. The song was one of seven Linkin Park songs used in the collaboration between the band and rapper Jay-Z ("Dirt off Your Shoulder/Lying from You") on the mash-up album Collision Course released in November 2004.

In live shows of 2008, "Lying from You" used a new intro, removing all samples from the intro and first half of the first verse.

Interview with Mike Shinoda, March 2003 ShoutWeb:

Music video
Live footage of the song from Linkin Park's live album Live in Texas has been used as the music video. The live version of the song was used in internet versions of the video. This live video is available on iTunes, along with "Points of Authority".

Track listing
Promo CD-R

Personnel
 Mike Shinoda - keyboards, rapping, sampler
 Chester Bennington - vocals
 Brad Delson - guitar
 Dave "Phoenix" Farrell - bass guitar
 Joe Hahn - turntables, samplers
 Rob Bourdon - drums

Chart performance
"Lying from You" was released as an airplay-only single from the album. It was released only in the United States in 2004, and in Canada as a live music video with footage from Live in Texas. It reached number one on the Modern Rock Tracks chart, giving the band their fourth consecutive number one from Meteora. On the Mainstream Rock Tracks chart, it spent five weeks at number two and peaked at number 58 on the Billboard Hot 100 chart.

See also
List of Billboard number-one alternative singles of the 2000s

References

External links
"Lying from You" official lyrics

Linkin Park songs
2003 songs
2004 singles
Songs written by Mike Shinoda
Warner Records singles